KRFE (580 AM) is a radio station licensed to Lubbock, Texas. The station airs a news/talk format. It dropped its long-time format of easy listening and pop music on October 24, 2016. Local hosts include Wade Wilkes, Jim Stewart and Kim Davis, adding their newest host as of recent, BreAnna Stanek".

KRFE (AM) previously used the call signs KDAV (AM), KRLB (AM) and KJBX (AM).

Previous formats included full-service Country, Pop, ABC Stardust, R&B/Rap, Hot A/C, and a hybrid of Easy Listening Music (reminiscent of KAAM-AM's former format in Dallas/Ft. Worth).

In 1953, KDAV was a 500 watt daytimer on 580 kHz. Studios, transmitters and towers have always been near 66th and Quirt Avenue (today known as 6602 Martin Luther King). That station was founded by Dave Elmore, David Worley and David Pinkston. KDAV 580 became KRLB in 1979. It added an FM at 99.5 (KWGO-FM, then KRLB-FM, then KCRM-FM, now KQBR-FM).

Ownership of this station changed many times over the decades, various partners came and went. In 1975, 49% of the station was sold to "Mexican American Services, Inc" for 60,000 dollars. A couple of years later (1977) the other 51% was sold for another 60,000 dollars. The former 99.5 KWGO, now KQBR, was sold to KRLB, Inc (Ed Wilkes, owner of AM 580 KRLB) in 1980 for 380,000 dollars. In 1983 KRLB Inc. was sold to Ken Dowe. Dowe owned several stations throughout Texas, and had made himself a name in radio during 20 years with Gordon McClendon's KLIF 1190 in Dallas. Dowe continued co-ownership of KRLB AM/FM (KRLB AM LATER KJBX AM, then KRFE AM) until the mid '90s (1993 or 1994) when it was sold to South Plains Broadcasting (owner of KFMX-FM & KKAM-AM) through a bankruptcy auction. At that time South Plains Broadcasting had no interest in retaining AM 580 and would sell the station back to "Big" Ed Wilkes and Paul Beane. Wade Wilkes is the current owner of KRFE AM Inc.

KRFE's building was expanded in the early 80s. The original KDAV building is in the center of the newer construction. The area includes the original 1950s era transmitter. KRFE is a designated Buddy Holly Site as recognized by the City of Lubbock.

Jay Leeson hosted KRFE's local afternoon drive talk show in two separate stints, the last one ending on March 29, 2019. Previous afternoon show hosts for KRFE in the 2000s and 2010s included: Armando Gonzales & Ysidro Gutierrez, former Lubbock City Councilman Todd Klein & Lance Cansino, and Kelly Plasker.

In November 2019, Paul McArthur commenced hosting KRFE's local afternoon show, weekdays from 5pm-6pm.

In late February 2020, KRFE began simulcasting on 95.9 FM; a 99-watt FM translator, licensed as K240FA-FX.

External links
KRFE 580 am Facebook
KRFE's website

RFE